The Waccamaw Indian People is a state-recognized tribe and nonprofit organization headquartered in Conway, South Carolina. The organization was awarded the status of a state-recognized tribe by the South Carolina Commission of Minority Affairs on February 17, 2005 and holds the distinction of being the first state-recognized tribe within South Carolina. They are not federally recognized as a Native American tribe and are one of two organizations that allege to be descended from the historic Waccamaw tribe, the other being the Waccamaw Siouan Indians, a state-recognized tribe in North Carolina.

Organization 
On October 28, 1992, the organization formed as a 501(c)(3) nonprofit organization, being originally called the Chicora-Waccamaw Indian People. The group's agent, president, and chief is Harold D. "Buster" Hatcher.

Proposed legislation 
US Representative Tom Rice (R-SC-7) introduced HR 1942 Waccamaw Indian Acknowledgment Act in 2021 to attempt to secure federal recognition for the organization.

Activities 
The WIP host an annual powwow every November in Aynor, South Carolina. The Horry County Museum showcased the exhibition The Waccamaw Indian People: Past, Present, and Future in 2021.

External links 
 
 South Carolina Commission on Minority Affairs

Notes 

1992 establishments in South Carolina
Cultural organizations based in South Carolina
Horry County, South Carolina
Native American tribes in South Carolina
Non-profit organizations based in South Carolina
State-recognized tribes in the United States